The following are the national records in athletics in Sierra Leone maintained by its national athletics federation: Sierra Leone Amateur Athletic Association (SLAAA).

Outdoor

Key to tables:

+ = en route to a longer distance

h = hand timing

X = annulled due to doping violation

NWI = no wind information

Men

Women

Indoor

Men

Women

Notes

References

External links

Sierra Leone
Records
Athletics